The 2022 Ceredigion County Council election took place as of 5 May 2022 to elect 38 members to Ceredigion Council. On the same day, elections were held to the other 21 local authorities and to community councils in Wales as part of the 2022 Welsh local elections. The previous all-council election took place in May 2017 and future elections will take place every five years.

Background 
Council elections in Wales were originally scheduled for May 2021, but were delayed to avoid a conflict with the 2021 Senedd election. The frequency of the elections was also increased from 4 years to five years to avoid future clashes, meaning (after 2022) the next council election is expected in 2027.

The number of councillors was decreased by 4 after the Local Democracy and Boundary Commission for Wales recommended the change in a report in May 2019. The number of wards was also decreased to 34 from 40.

Plaid Cymru groups in conjunction with Independent group had been in control of the council since 2012. Ellen ap Gwynn had been the leader of the council and leader of the Plaid Cymru group in the council since 2012, but she stepped back from that role after the elections. Bryan Davies, the County Councillor for Llannarth was chosen as the successor of ap Gwynn and leader of the Plaid Cymru group.

Ward Changes 
In August 2021 Welsh Government accepted a number of ward change proposals by the Local Democracy and Boundary Commission for Wales, with slight modifications on Welsh language names for some wards. These took effect from the 2022 council election. The changes gave a better parity of representation. 4 wards; Aberystwyth Penparcau, Aberystwyth Morlais a Glais, Beulah and Llangoedmor and Aberporth and Y Ferwig will be electing 2 councillors. 19 current wards will see no change under these reforms.

 The existing Rhyd-y-Fuwch and Teifi wards in the town of Cardigan were merged to create a single electoral ward named Cardigan-Teifi.
 The existing Aberporth ward was merged with the community of y Ferwig (previously in the Llangoedmor ward) to create a new two-member electoral ward named Aberporth and Y Ferwig.
 The existing Beulah ward was merged with the community of Llangoedmor to create a new two-member electoral ward named Beulah and Llangoedmor. 
 The Capel Dewi and Trefol wards in the community of Llandysul were merged to create a new electoral ward named Llandysul South.
 The existing Troedyraur ward was combined with the Pontshaen and Tregroes wards of the community of Llandysul to create a new electoral ward named Llandysul North and Troedyraur.
 The existing New Quay ward was combined with the community of Llanllwchaearn to create a new electoral ward named New Quay and Llanllwchaearn.
 The communities of Llandysiliogogo and Llangrannog were combined to create a new electoral ward named Llandysilio and Llangrannog.
 The existing Penbryn ward was replaced by a new ward of the same name comprising only the community of Penbryn.
 The existing Aberaeron ward was combined with the LLanddewi Aberarth ward of the community of Dyffryn Arth to create a new electoral ward named Aberaeron and Aberarth.
 The existing Llansanffraid ward was replaced by a ward of the same name comprising the community of Llansanffraid and the Llanbadarn Trefeglwys ward of the community of Dyffryn Arth.
 The existing Lampeter ward continues with the same boundaries but with one councillor rather than two.

Candidates by party
A total of 86 candidates stood for the 38 seats on the council (an average of 2.3 candidates per seat). Six political parties stood candidates in this election, plus 27 independent candidates.

Five candidates (two independent, one Plaid Cymru, one Liberal Democrat, one Labour) were the only candidates in their ward, and were thus returned unopposed without an election taking place.

Overview of results 
Plaid Cymru won control of Ceredigion County Council in this election. With the number of seats reduced to 38, 20 seats were required for an outright majority. Plaid Cymru won 20 seats (no net change), independents lost four seats, while the Liberal Democrats lost one seat to Gwlad.

|-bgcolor=#F6F6F6
| colspan=2 style="text-align: right; margin-right: 1em" | Total
| style="text-align: right;" | 38
| colspan=5 |
| style="text-align: right;" | 27,282
| style="text-align: right;" | 
|-
|}

Ward results 
* = sitting councillor in this ward prior to election

Aberaeron and Aberarth (1 seat) 
This ward was formed from a merger of the existing Aberaeron ward with the western portion of the Llansantffraed ward around the village of Aberarth.

Aberporth and Y Ferwig (2 seats) 
This ward was formed by a merger of the Aberporth ward and the northern part of the Pen-parc ward. Prior to this election, Clive Davies was the incumbent councillor for Pen-parc ward, while Gethin Davies was the incumbent councillor for the Aberporth ward.

Aberystwyth Morfa a Glais (2 seats) 
This ward was formed from a merger of Aberystwyth North ward, Aberystwyth Bronglais ward, Aberystwyth Central ward and the north-western part of Llanbadarn Fawr Sulien ward.

Prior to this election, Mark Anthony Strong was the incumbent councillor for Aberystwyth North ward, while Alun Williams was the incumbent councillor for Aberystwyth Bronglais ward.

Aberystwyth Penparcau (2 seats)

Aberystwyth Rheidol (1 seat)

Beulah and Llangoedmor (2 seats) 
This ward was formed by a merger of the southern part of Pen-parc ward, and all of Beulah ward. Prior to the election, both of these were held by Plaid Cymru.

Borth (1 seat)

Ceulan a Maesmawr (1 seat)

Ciliau Aeron (1 seat)

Faenor (1 seat)

Lampeter (1 seat)

Llanbadarn Fawr (1 seat) 
Gareth Davies was the incumbent councillor for the ward of Llanbadarn Fawr, Padarn ward prior to the election, which was merged with part of the Llanbadarn Fawr, Sulien ward (the other part of Sulien forming part of the new Aberystwyth Morlais a Glais ward).

Llandyfriog (1 seat)

Llandysilio and Llangrannog (1 seat) 
This ward was formed from a merger of the larger south-western section of the Llandysilio-gogo ward and the north eastern section of the Penbryn ward.

Llandysul North and Troedyraur (1 seat) 
This ward was formed from a merger of the Troedyraur ward and the northern half of the Capel Dewi ward. Prior to this election, both wards were held by independents.

Llandysul South (1 seat) 
This ward was formed by a merger of the Llandysul Town ward and the south-eastern half of the Capel Dewi ward. Both wards were held by independents prior to this election. Keith Evans was the incumbent councillor for Llandysul Town ward prior to this election.

Llanfarian (1 seat)

Llanfihangel Ystrad (1 seat)

Llangeitho (1 seat)

Llangybi (1 seat)

Llannarth (1 seat)

Llanrhystyd (1 seat)

Llanwenog (1 seat)

Llansanffraid (1 seat) 
The area of this ward was reduced for this election, with the eastern portion of the ward around Aberarth merging with the Aberaeron ward to form Aberaeron and Aberarth.

Lledrod (1 seat) 
The area of this ward was reduced for this election, with the south-eastern portion of the ward around Ystrad Fflur merging with the Tregaron ward to form Tregaron and Ystrad Fflur.

Melindwr (1 seat)

Mwldan (1 seat) 
The English name for this ward was 'Cardigan Mwldan' prior to this election. No changes were made to the ward's boundaries.

New Quay and Llanllwchaearn (1 seat) 
This ward was formed from a merger of the existing New Quay ward plus a northern section of the Llandysilio-gogo ward.

Penbryn (1 seat) 
The area of this ward was reduced for this election, with the north-eastern portion of the ward around Llangrannog merging with part of the Llandysilio ward to form Llandysilio and Llangrannog.

Teifi (1 seat) 
The Teifi ward was created for this election by the merging of the 'Cardigan, Teifi' and 'Cardigan, Rhydyfuwch' wards. Prior to the election, Elaine Evans was the incumbent councillor for 'Cardigan, Rhydyfuwch' ward, while Catrin Miles was the incumbent councillor for 'Cardigan, Teifi' ward.

Tirymynach (1 seat)

Trefeurig (1 seat)

Tregaron and Ystrad Fflur (1 seat) 
This ward was formed from a merger of the existing Tregaron ward with a south-eastern portion of Lledrod ward. Prior to this election Ifan Davies was the incumbent councillor for Lledrod ward, and Catherine Hughes was the incumbent councillor for Tregaron ward.

Ystwyth (1 seat)

By-elections

Lampeter (6 October 2022)

References 

Ceredigion
Ceredigion County Council elections
21st century in Ceredigion